The Høyen Medal is one of several medals awarded by the Royal Danish Academy of Fine Arts. It is named after Niels Laurits Høyen, known as the first Danish art historian.

The N. L. Høyen Medal is awarded to art historians and other theorists, arts administrators, educators and journalists.

Recipients

2020s
 2020: Karsten Ifversen.

2010s
 2019 Jan Haugaard
 2018 Gitte Ørskou
 2017 Flemming Friborg
 2017 Jan Falk Borup
 2016 Arkitekt Ib Møller
 2016 Inge Merete Kjeldgaard
 2015  Lars Dybdahl
 2015 Kent Martinussen
 2014 Hanne Raabyemagle
 2014 Sanne Kofod Olsen
 2013 Thomas Bo Jensen
 2013 Teresa Nielsen
 2012 Mikael Wivel
 2012 Karen Lintrup
 2012 Cort Ross Dinesen
 2011 Mikkel Bogh
 2010 Mette Sandbye

2000s
2009 Gertrud Købke Sutton
 2008 Steen Møller Rasmussen
 2008 Steen Estvad Petersen
 2008 Merete Ahnfeldt-Mollerup
 2008 Rune Gade
 2007 Jan Gehl
 2007 Jens Kvorning
 2007 Jesper Fabricius
 2007 Leila Krogh
 2006 Gregers Algreen-Ussing
 2006 Mogens Nykjær
 2006 Knud Pedersen
 2005 Lene Burkard
 2004 Malene Hauxner
 2004 Lars Marcussen
 2004 John Hunov
 2004 Bente Scavenius
 2003 Torsten Bløndal
 2003 Poul Vad
 2002 Bodil Kaalund
 2002 Henrik Sten Møller
 2002 Carsten Thau
 2001 Charlotte Christensen
 2001 Kjeld Kjeldsen
 2001 Annemarie Lund
 2001 Nils-Ole Lund
 2000 Ulla Strømberg
 2000 Kjeld Vindum

1900s
 1999 Henrik Bramsen
 1999 Grete Zahle
 1998 Kim Dirckinck-Holmfeld  
 1998 Poul Erik Tøjner  
 1998 Karsten Ohrt  
 1998 Ejner Johansson  
 1996  Troels Andersen  
 1996 Allan de Waal  
 1995 Else Marie Bukdahl
 1995 Kjeld de Fine Licht Licht
 1995 Hakon Lund  
 1994 Poul Erik Skriver  
 1993 Hans Edvard Nørregård-Nielsen 
 1992 Arne Karlsen  
 1992 Mogens Krustrup  
 1991 Per Arnoldi  
 1990 Lisbet Balslev Jørgensen

1980s
 1989 Hans Erling Langkilde 
 1988 Tobias Faber 
 1987 Robert Dahlmann  
 1987 Holger Windfeldt Schmidt  
 1986 Hans Jørgen Brøndum  
 1986 Poul Hansen  
 1985 Ole Thomassen  
 1985 Viggo Clausen  
 1984 Poul Pedersen 
 1984 Elna Møller  
 1984 Ole Braunstein

See also 

List of European art awards

References

Danish art awards
Royal Danish Academy of Fine Arts
1984 establishments in Denmark